Aeopelys is a monotypic genus of lace bugs, found in New Guinea. The sole species is A. neata.

References
Froeschner, R.C., 2001. Lace Bug Genera of the World, II: Subfamily Tinginae: tribes Litadeini and Ypsotingini (Heteroptera: Tingidae). Smithsonian Contributions to Zoology, No. 611.
Drake, C.J. & Ruhoff, F.A., 1960. Lace-bug genera of the world. (Hemiptera: Tingidae). Proc. U.S. Natl. Mus. 112 (3431): 1-105, 9 pls.
Drake, C.J. & Ruhoff, F.A., 1965. Lace-bugs of the world: a catalogue. (Hemiptera: Tingidae). Bulletin of the United States National Museum: 243, 1-643.

Tingidae
Arthropods of New Guinea